Chicago '78 is a two-disc live album by guitarist, singer, and songwriter Frank Zappa, released in November 2016, consisting of the recording of the entire second concert performed on September 29, 1978 at the Uptown Theatre in Chicago, Illinois.

Production 
When creating the album, co-producer Joe Travers found that there were several gaps in the main concert recording, caused by the changing of tape reels.  He was able to capture the entire show by splicing in recordings from two other sources.

Critical reception 

On AllMusic, Sean Westergaard said, "This album is the entire show and fans are going to love it.... Some of the songs are merely performed well, but there are enough surprises and great solos that fans will be pleased. This isn't the place to start your Zappa collection, but releases of full FZ shows are rare and hearing another full show with Vinnie Colaiuta on drums is a treat."

Track listing

Personnel 
Musicians
 Frank Zappa – guitar, vocals
 Ike Willis – guitar, vocals
 Denny Walley – slide guitar, vocals
 Tommy Mars – keyboards, vocals
 Peter Wolf – keyboards
 Ed Mann – percussion, vocals
 Arthur Barrow – bass, vocals
 Vinnie Colaiuta – drums, vocals
Production
 Original recordings produced by Frank Zappa
 Produced for release by Gail Zappa and Joe Travers
 1978 mix engineer: Davy Moire
 1978 recordist: Claus Weideman
 2014 re-mix engineer: Craig Parker Adams, Winslow CT Studio, Hollywood CA
 2014 mastering engineer: Bob Ludwig, Gateway Mastering

References 

Frank Zappa live albums
2016 live albums
Live albums published posthumously